El Salar Airport is a high elevation airport serving the mineral salt mining operations on the Salar de Atacama salt flat, in the Antofagasta Region of Chile.

See also

Transport in Chile
List of airports in Chile

References

External links
OpenStreetMap - El Salar Airport
OurAirports - El Salar Airport
SkyVector - El Salar Airport
FallingRain - Salar de Atacama Airport

Airports in Antofagasta Region
Atacama Desert